Yaroslav Igorevich Korolev (born 7 May 1987) is a Russian former professional basketball player.

Professional career
Korolev began his pro career with the Russian club Avtodor Saratov. Korolev was then selected 12th overall in the 2005 NBA Draft, by the Los Angeles Clippers. Korolev played for CSKA Moscow in the Russian Super League, before joining the Clippers. On 6 July 2007 the Clippers offered Korolev a contract to remain with the team, but then rescinded their offer in September 2007. He then returned to the Clippers during the preseason, on a non-guaranteed contract, but was waived before the season began.

In December 2007, Korolev signed with Dynamo Moscow. In November 2009, Korolev was drafted in the fourth round of the NBDL, Draft by the Albuquerque Thunderbirds. He was traded to the Reno Bighorns on 19 January 2010.

On 26 July 2010 he signed a contract with Spanish club CB Granada. In August 2011, he signed with Lagun Aro GBC. In December 2012, he joined Spartak St. Petersburg. 

In October 2014, Korolev signed with the Greek League team Panionios for the 2014–15 season. On 16 December 2016 Korolev announced his retirement. His last team was Basket Navarra Club, with which he played in 2016.

NBA career statistics

Regular season 

|-
| align="left" | 2005–06
| align="left" | Clippers
| 24 || 0 || 5.3 || .300 || .286 || .700 || .5 || .4 || .1 || .0 || 1.1
|-
| align="left" | 2006–07
| align="left" | Clippers
| 10 || 0 || 4.1 || .250 || .200 || .500 || .3 || .4 || .3 || .0 || 1.2
|- class="sortbottom"
| style="text-align:center;" colspan="2"| Career
| 34 || 0 || 4.9 || .283 || .250 || .625 || .5 || .4 || .2 || .0 || 1.1

References

External links
Twitter Account
NBA.com Profile

Euroleague.net Profile
Eurobasket.com Profile
Greek Basket League Profile 
Spanish League Profile 
Draftexpress.com Profile
Yaroslav Korolev Pictures

1987 births
Living people
Albuquerque Thunderbirds players
Basket Navarra Club players
BC Avtodor Saratov players
BC Dynamo Moscow players
BC Spartak Saint Petersburg players
CB Granada players
Gipuzkoa Basket players
Liga ACB players
Los Angeles Clippers draft picks
Los Angeles Clippers players
National Basketball Association players from Russia
Panionios B.C. players
PBC CSKA Moscow players
Power forwards (basketball)
Reno Bighorns players
Russian men's basketball players
Russian expatriate basketball people in the United States
Rethymno B.C. players
Small forwards
Basketball players from Moscow